Ian Anthony Eastwood (born April 16, 1993) is an actor, dancer, choreographer, director and previous member of the dance group, Mos Wanted Crew, featured on America's Best Dance Crew. He was featured on NBC's new TV show World of Dance as Ian Eastwood and the Young Lions. He has also worked with The Millennium Dance Complex, Coastal Dance Rage, and Movement Lifestyle. He appeared on Dance Showdown and Return of the Superstars. He has also starred in the 2016 movie High Strung.

Early life

Eastwood was born in Chicago, Illinois. He is the son of Peter and Julia Eastwood. He started dancing at the age of 10 years old and later moved to Hollywood after graduating high school to pursue a career in dance.

Videography

Film

Television

Commercials

Music videos

References

Living people
1993 births
American choreographers